Karl Streitmann (8 May 1853 – 29 October 1937) was an Austrian stage actor and operatic tenor.

Life 

His debut took place in Bratislava (as Geßler, Gringoire and Hamlet), then in Berlin (inaugural role Franz Moor, 16 August 1878), Bydgoszcz, Toruń and Sigmaringen. Afterwards at the Carltheater in Vienna and in Prague at the Landestheater, where he sang Jose in Carmen and Tamino in The Magic Flute. In the world premiere of The Gypsy Baron he performed Barinkay and also took part in other operetta performances. He completed a tour of North America: from Southampton he embarked on a ship to New York, where he made his debut as a gypsy baron on 22 September 1889. Stops in Chicago, Philadelphia, Pittsburgh, Baltimore, Washington etc. followed. He also learned English, so that he was able to perform with the prima donna Lillian Russell in Madison Square Garden on 26 October 1891.

His further activities took place at the Friedrich-Wilhelmstädtisches Theater in Berlin from 1901 to 1902, again at the Carltheater in Vienna from 1902 to 1905, and he made frequent guest appearances at the Staatsoper Unter den Linden in Berlin, the Hoftheater in Stuttgart and in Amsterdam. In 1908 at the Theater an der Wein, he created the role of Alexius in Der tapfere Soldat (The Chocolate Soldier).

He died impoverished in Vienna. His  is located in the urn grove of the Feuerhalle Simmering (division 6, ring 3, group 3, number 47). In 1955 the Streitmanngasse in Vienna-Hietzing was named after him.

Between 1882 and 1884 Streitmann was married with the actress Louise Übermasser as well as from 1904 with the singer Gisela Noë. His sister Rosa Streitmann was also an operatic soprano, and his aunt was Rosa Csillag.

Filmography 
 1913: Johann Strauß an der schönen blauen Donau.

Further reading 
 
 Ludwig Eisenberg: Großes biographisches Lexikon der Deutschen Bühne im XIX. Jahrhundert. Paul List, Leipzig 1903, .,.
 Alexander Rausch, Monika Kornberger: Streitmann, Geschwister in the Oesterreichisches Musiklexikon. Online-edition, Vienna 2002 ff., ; printed edition: Volume 5, Publishing house of the Austrian Academy of Sciences, Vienna 2006, .

External links 
 Streitmann Karl on Operissimo
 Karl Steimann in the German Early Cinema Database
 Karl Streitmann on Filmportal

References 

Austrian operatic tenors
Austrian stage actors
Austrian male silent film actors
20th-century Austrian male actors
1853 births
1937 deaths
Musicians from Vienna